Radio Coteaux is an associated local community radio station, embedded in the quaint French village Saint-Blancard in the Gers region, the heart of Gascony, in Occitanie (south of France), some 100km south of Toulouse. Radio Coteaux is a French-language station, but also caters to the large number of expatriates that rank among its listeners through its stellar Sunday evening English-language Gascony Show broadcast.

Rock, Latino, Jazz, World

Radio Coteaux offers tremendous depth and breadth of programs with genres ranging from Rock, Latino, Jazz, and World, etc.

A gem to the community

Radio Coteaux is tightly knitted to the surrounding community, attending many events in the Gascony region, supporting numerous charitable causes, producing ecological programs on environment, and promoting tourism to the region through its close ties to CILT, le Centre d'Insertion par le Loisir et le Tourisme.

Biker Street

The enormously popular Biker Street program, hosted by biker fan and radio veteran César, is transmitted every Monday evening from 6:30pm to 8pm CET, and is replayed Thursdays at 5:30pm CET. With over 430 shows aired, Biker Street is one of the longest running music shows in the region. This is a program of Blues, Rock and Blues-Rock, and it really does rock!

Welcoming foreigners
The arrival of a large number of ex-pats to the region in recent years has prompted Radio Coteaux to reach out to the newcomers with an all-English radio show called the Gascony Show, hosted by Irishman John Slattery. Through this show, Radio Coteaux aims to extend a warm welcome to all foreigners, hoping to make them feel right at home, while at the same time providing some light entertainment in English for its French listeners.

Finance
The radio station has 2 permanent staff, anchor men Patrick and César. In addition, the station relies heavily on volunteers and support by sponsors and government grants. Financial donations to the station are always welcome.

External links
César home page
Gascony Show home page
Radio Coteaux home page
Emission de Vivre en Comminges

Radio stations in France
Radio stations established in 1982